The Cambridge University Heraldic and Genealogical Society was formed as the result of the merger in 1957 of a previous Heraldic Society (founded 1948) with the Cambridge University Society of Genealogists (founded 1954).

Foundation of the society
The first Cambridge University Heraldic Society was founded in 1948 from the remnants of the late nineteenth-century Monumental Brass Society. In 1954, a separate Cambridge University Society of Genealogists was formed. Not surprisingly many members of one society were members of the other and on 10 June 1957, sponsored by some vice-presidents, by agreement between the secretaries, special general meetings of both societies were held and resolutions passed abolishing both societies on condition that a new joint society was formed later in the day. Meetings held earlier in the term had led to the formal culmination of a series of discussions for the consolidation and amalgamation.

The structure of the new society was to include a patron and a number of honorary vice-presidents. The committee was to consist of a president, a secretary, a senior treasurer, a junior treasurer and ordinary committee members.

The society today 
Four speaker meetings are held in each of the Michaelmas and Lent terms and a ninth at the beginning of the Easter term. These are in the general area of heraldry and genealogy but also include cognate subjects such as ceremonial dress, tartan, local history, customs, military medals or indeed anything of an antiquarian nature. There are generally two outings each year—one in Michaelmas and one in Lent-–to places of heraldic and genealogical interest. In recent years, the society has visited the College of Arms, the Society of Genealogists and various cathedrals and museums. The society also hosts one large dinner each term with the Annual Dinner (in the Lent term) attracting up to 70 diners. In March 2023 this was held at the House of Lords. There is also a garden party in the Easter term.

In 2022 the society hosted the 35th International Congress of Genealogical and Heraldic Sciences patronized by The Earl of Wessex, and attended by officers of arms from many different nations (including Garter King of Arms, Lord Lyon King of Arms, and the Deputy Chief Herald of Canada).

Patrons 

Patrons of the society since 1957:

Louis Mountbatten, 1st Earl Mountbatten of Burma KG GCB OM GCSI GCIE GCVO DSO ADC PC FRS, 1957–1979.
Archbishop Bruno Heim, (Apostolic Pro-Nuncio to Great Britain 1982–1985), 1980–2003. 
Edward Fitzalan-Howard, 18th Duke of Norfolk GCVO DL, Earl Marshal and Hereditary Marshal of England, 2003–present.

Sir Arthur Cochrane (Clarenceux King of Arms) was Patron of the original Heraldic and Genealogical Societies until his death in 1954. The position was still vacant when the amalgamation took place. The Cambridge University Society of Genealogists had had a president in the person of the late Earl Mountbatten of Burma, a keen genealogist. Therefore, Lord Mountbatten was invited to be Patron of the new (1957) society, a post which he held until his assassination in 1979.

Lord Mountbatten was succeeded as Patron by Archbishop Bruno Heim, a leading authority on the heraldry of the Roman Catholic Church who designed armorial bearings for several Popes. Heim donated a copy of a number of his own publications to the society. After his death he was followed by the Duke of Norfolk, Earl Marshal and Hereditary Marshal of England.

Notable past speakers and guests
The society is primarily a discussion group. Notable past speakers have included:
Sir Alexander Colin Cole KCB KCVO TD, Garter Principal King of Arms, 1978–1992.
Michael Maclagan CVO, Richmond Herald, 1980–89, and Lord Mayor of Oxford, 1970–71.    
Sir Conrad Swan KCVO, Garter Principal King of Arms 1992–5.
Wilfrid Scott-Giles, Fitzalan Pursuivant Extraordinary and heraldic writer
John Brooke-Little CVO, Clarenceux King of Arms, 1995–7, and founder of the Heraldry Society. 
Hubert Chesshyre, Clarenceux King of Arms, 1997–2010. 
Jonathan Riley-Smith, Dixie Professor of Ecclesiastical History, 1994–2011. 
Cecil Humphery-Smith OBE, founder of the Institute of Heraldic and Genealogical Studies
Sir Peter Gwynn-Jones KCVO, Garter King, 1995–2010.
Lt-Col Rodney Dennys CVO OBE, Somerset Herald, 196–82, High Sheriff of East Sussex, 1983–4. 
Bobby Milburn, Anglican priest, successively Dean of Worcester and Master of the Temple. 
John George, Officer of Arms in the Court of the Lord Lyon.
Sedley Andrus LVO, Lancaster Herald, 1972–82. 
Patric Dickinson LVO, Clarenceux King, 2010–present.
Sir Henry Paston-Bedingfeld, 10th Baronet, Norroy and Ulster King of Arms, 2010–14, and Master of the Worshipful Company of Scriveners, 2012–3.
Sir Thomas Woodcock KCVO, Garter King, 2010–present. 
Prince Tomislav of Yugoslavia (alumnus of Clare College 1946-1947).
HRH Prince Michael of Kent GCVO
Sir Malcolm Innes of Edingight KCVO, Lord Lyon King of Arms, 1981–2001.
Timothy Duke, Norroy and Ulster King of Arms, 2014–present. 
Marjorie Chibnall OBE FBA, mediaeval historian
Alastair Lorne Campbell of Airds, Unicorn Pursuivant, 1986–2008.
Maurice Couve de Murville, Archbishop of Birmingham, 1982–1999.
Major-General  Alastair Bruce of Crionaich OBE VR DL, Governor of Edinburgh Castle (2019-present), Fitzalan Pursuivant Extraordinary.
Sir John Hamilton Baker, QC, Downing Professor of the Laws of England, 1998–2011.
Robert Shirley, 13th Earl Ferrers PC DL
The Lord Lingfield DL
Dr Clive Cheesman, Richmond Herald, 2010–present.
David Sellar MVO, Lord Lyon King of Arms, 2008–14.
Prince Ermias Sahle Selassie of Ethiopia and the House of Solomon. (2020 & 2021). 
Prince Idris bin Abdullah al-Senussi of Libya and the House of Senussi. (2021). 
Kristóf Szalay-Bobrovniczky, former Hungarian Ambassador to the Court of St James's, 2016–2020, Minister of Defence (Hungary), 2022-present. (2021). 
Sophie Katsarava MBE, Georgian Ambassador to the Court of St James's, 2020–present. (2022). 
Joseph Morrow CBE, Lord Lyon King of Arms, 2014–present. (2021).
Balthazar Napoleon IV de Bourbon of the House of Bourbon-Bhopal. (2021). 
The Hon. Richard Cubitt, heir apparent to Mark Cubitt, 5th Baron Ashcombe. (2021). 
Graham Bartram, Chief Vexillologist and Trustee of the UK Flag Institute. (2021). 
The Hon. Dr Philip Sidney, heir apparent to Philip Sidney, 2nd Viscount De L'Isle. (2022). 
Simon Isaacs, 4th Marquess of Reading.(2021).
Liam Devlin, Rothesay Herald, 2021–present. (2022 & 2023). 
Prince Juan de Bagration-Mukhrani of Georgia and the House of Mukhrani. (2022).
 Elizabeth Roads LVO, Secretary of the Order of the Thistle. (2022).
James Terzian CStJ, Registrar and Genealogist of the Venerable Order of St John (Priory in the USA). (2022).
Professor Kate Williams FRHistS. (2022).
Lt-Col Dr Charels Gauci, Chief Herald of Arms of Malta, 2019-present. (2023).
Bruce Patterson, Deputy Chief Herald of Canada 2010-present. (2023).
The Rt Hon Mark Cubitt, 5th Baron Ashcombe. (2023). 
Prince Philippe de Croÿ-Sorle. (2023). 
David White, Garter King of Arms, 2021-present. (2023).

Publications 
In the late 1950s and early 1960s, the society transcribed the registers of the Cambridgeshire parishes of Shepreth and Westley Waterless and published a small number of copies. Its most ambitious project, however, was to produce The Cambridge Armorial showing the arms of all the corporate armigers in Cambridge (including town, university, colleges, theological colleges and schools) with blazons and brief histories of each. Although begun in 1966, it was to be nineteen years before it was published through the efforts of Wilfrid Scott-Giles, Heather Peak, Cecil Humphery-Smith and Dr Gordon H Wright. In 1995 the society launched a magazine, called the Escutcheon, which appears each term, edited by Derek Palgrave. It is now edited by Terence Trelawny-Gower.

Presidents

The current and 58th President is Edward Hilary Davis. The following people have held the office of president of the society:

The Mountbatten Commemorative Lecture

Following the Assassination of Louis Mountbatten, 1st Earl Mountbatten of Burma, the society wished to honour its late Patron. With the permission of his elder daughter, Countess Mountbatten of Burma, the society inaugurated the Mountbatten Commemorative Lecture. This remains the most important meeting of the year and the lecture has frequently been given by senior members of the College of Arms which have included five successive Garter Kings of Arms (as well as two Lord Lyon Kings of Arms). In 1994, the society was greatly honoured when the Lecture was given by (as he now is) Prince Michael of Kent. The lecture for the year 1984–1985 was concerned with the genealogy of Lord Mountbatten himself and was delivered in the presence of Prince Edward, Earl of Wessex who was at that time an undergraduate at Jesus College.

42nd) 2022	"The Heraldry and History of Georgia"	Prince Juan de Bagration-Mukhrani of Georgia and the House of Mukhrani
41st) 2021	"The Court of the Lord Lyon" Joseph Morrow CBE, Lord Lyon King of Arms
40th) 2020	"The Genealogy of Monsignor Alfred Newman Gilbey"	Ronald Creighton-Jobe
39th) 2019	"The Graces of Cambridge Colleges and Related Dining Customs"	J. Cable
38th) 2018	"The Monarchical Republic of Oliver Cromwell"	Dr David Smith
37th) 2017	"The Heraldry of Eton College"	David Broomfield, Membership Secretary
36th) 2016	"Out of the Blue: Oxford Academic Dress in the Twentieth Century"	A.J.P. North
35th) 2015	"Norroy's Reminiscences "	Sir Henry Paston-Bedingfeld Bt., Norroy and Ulster King of Arms
34th) 2014	"The College of Arms in the Second World War"	Peter O'Donoghue (officer of arms), York Herald
33rd) 2013	"Heraldry and Ceremonial in the Holy Roman Empire"	Dr B.J.G.A. Kress, Secretary 2003–2006, The Warburg Institute
32nd) 2012	Title to be announced	Sir Thomas Woodcock, Garter Principal King of Arms
31st) 2011	"Heraldry of York Minster"	Dr P.A. Fox, President 1984–1985
30th) 2010	"The Role of the Lord Lyon"	David Sellar, Lord Lyon King of Arms
29th) 2009	"‘Les Grandes d'Espagne ne danseront pas:’ Dukes, ducal lookalikes and the dilemmata of rank in Ancien Régime France"	Dr Leonhard Horowski
28th) 2008	"The Court of Chivalry in Stuart Heraldry"	Dr Vittoria Feola, Université libre de Bruxelles
27th) 2007	"The College of Arms in the Eighteenth Century"	Peter O'Donoghue (officer of arms), York Herald
26th) 2006	"Music in Heraldry"	Sir Henry Paston-Bedingfeld Bt., Norroy and Ulster King of Arms 
25th) 2005	"The Society of Genealogists Library"	Mrs Susan Gibbons
24th) 2004	"Early New Zealand Grants of Arms"	David White, Garter Principal King of Arms
23rd) 2003	"State Funeral of Sir Winston Churchill"	Jack Darrah
22nd) 2002	"Montgomery Heraldry"	Dr E. Hugh Montgomery
21st) 2001	"Aspects of High State Heraldry"	John Brooke-Little, Clarenceux King of Arms
20th) 2000	"Earl Mountbatten and Genealogy"	Cecil Humphery-Smith
19th) 1999	"Back to the Future: European Heraldry after Communism"	Dr T.A.H. Wilkinson, Leverhulme Trust Special Research Fellow, University of Durham
18th) 1998	"The Most Noble Order of the Garter"	Hubert Chesshyre, Clarenceux King of Arms
17th) 1997	"Nelson's Heraldry"	David White, Garter Principal King of Arms
16th) 1996	"Military Heraldry"	Col. I.S. Swinnerton, TD JP DL, President of the Federation of Family History Societies
15th) 1995	Sir Conrad Swan, Garter Principal King of Arms
14th) 1994	"Lord Mountbatten" Prince Michael of Kent
13th) 1993	"The Bastards …"	John Brooke-Little, Clarenceux King of Arms
12th) 1992	"Polish Heraldry"	Sir Conrad Swan, Garter Principal King of Arms
11th) 1991	"The Baronies of East Anglia"	John Norton, Treasurer of Norfolk Heraldry Society
10th) 1990	"The Work of the College of Arms"	Sedley Andrus, Lancaster Herald later Beaumont Herald Extraordinary
9th) 1989	"Some Thoughts on the Origins of Heralds"	John Brooke-Little, Clarenceux King of Arms
8th) 1988	"Quinque saltus heraldici – Five Heraldic Leaps"	Sir Peter Gwynn-Jones, Garter King of Arms
7th) 1987	"European Armorials and Rolls – Some Thoughts and Comparisons"	C.J. Holyoake
6th) 1986	"Garter Knights and Officers of the Order of the Garter"	Sir Colin Cole, Garter Principal King of Arms
5th) 1985	"The Genealogy of the Earl Mountbatten of Burma"	Cecil Humphery-Smith
4th) 1984	"The Work and Records of the College of Arms"	John Brooke-Little, Clarenceux King of Arms
3rd) 1983	"J.H. Round"	Dr D. Stephenson
2nd) 1982	"Arthurian Heraldry"	Michael Maclagan, Richmond Herald (also Slains Pursuivant of Arms)
1st) 1981	"The Work of the College of Arms"	Sedley Andrus, Lancaster Herald later Beaumont Herald Extraordinary

Coat of arms

References

External links
The Cambridge University Heraldic and Genealogical Society

English heraldry
1957 establishments in England
Heraldry
Student organizations established in 1957
Heraldic societies
Family history societies in the United Kingdom